Herbert John Leslie Barefoot, GC (15 May 1887 – 23 December 1958) was a British Army officer and a recipient of the George Cross, the highest award for gallantry for actions not involving direct enemy action granted to British military personnel.

Early life and career
He was born Herbert John Leslie Barefoot the son of a timber merchant, Sidney John Barefoot and his wife Ellen Ann Mary née Towers.

He was educated as Dulwich College between 1900 and 1905. Before the First World War, he trained as an architect.

In the war, he served with the London Sanitary Company, Royal Army Medical Corps in the Egyptian Expeditionary Force (1916–1919). He was commissioned a lieutenant in the RAMC on 15 November 1915, and was promoted to captain on 15 May 1916. He was mentioned in despatches. He was demobilised on 30 September 1921, leaving the army as a captain. He continued to practice as an architect, becoming President of the Suffolk Association of Architects (1936–1938), and of the East Anglian Society of Architects in 1938.

Second World War
In the Second World War, he joined the Royal Engineers, working in bomb disposal. He was commissioned a lieutenant on 15 March 1940, and was awarded the George Cross in 1940 "for most conspicuous gallantry in carrying out hazardous work in a very brave manner". The citation includes the following comments:

He was promoted major in 1941 and returned to his architectural practice after the war. He died aged 71 in 1958.

Medals
Barefoot's medals are currently on display at the Imperial War Museum in London.

References

British recipients of the George Cross
1887 births
1958 deaths
People educated at Dulwich College
Royal Engineers officers
British Army personnel of World War I
British Army personnel of World War II
Bomb disposal personnel